Jim Berry (born 1984) is an Irish sportsperson. He plays hurling with his local club Faythe Harriers and also plays hurling for the Wexford senior and U21 team.
Married Margaret O Reilly, 17 August 2005 in Church Of The Most Holy Rosary Tullow, County Carlow

Playing career
Berry made his debut during the National Hurling league against Clare following his good showing last time out against Down.

References 

1989 births
Living people
Faythe Harriers hurlers
Wexford inter-county hurlers